Charles Edward Barnes (born October 5, 1939) is a former football end in the American Football League for the Dallas Texans.  He played college football at the University of Arkansas and University of Louisiana at Monroe. Charlie was drafted in the eighth round of the 1961 NFL Draft by the Washington Redskins. Barnes was also selected in the nineteenth round of the 1961 AFL Draft by the Buffalo Bills.

External links
Stats
University of Louisiana at Monroe Pro Football Alumni Page
Fanbase Page

1939 births
Living people
People from Chicot County, Arkansas
American football tight ends
Louisiana–Monroe Warhawks football players
Dallas Texans (AFL) players